The 1992–93 Sussex County Football League season was the 68th in the history of Sussex County Football League a football competition in England.

Division One

Division One featured 16 clubs which competed in the division last season, along with two new clubs, promoted from Division Two:
Midhurst & Easebourne
Portfield

League table

Division Two

Division Two featured 13 clubs which competed in the division last season, along with six new clubs.
Clubs relegated from Division One:
Haywards Heath Town
Shoreham
Clubs promoted from Division Three:
Hassocks
Mile Oak
Clubs resigned from the Isthmian League:
Eastbourne United
Southwick

League table

Division Three

Division Three featured ten clubs which competed in the division last season, along with four new clubs:
Bosham, relegated from Division Two
East Preston, relegated from Division Two
St Francis Hospital
Shinewater Association, joined from the East Sussex League

League table

References

1992-93
1992–93 in English football leagues